van Dantzig is a surname. Notable people with the surname include:

David van Dantzig (1900–1959), Dutch mathematician
Rachel van Dantzig (1878–1949), Dutch sculptor
Rudi van Dantzig (1933–2012), Dutch choreographer and writer

Surnames of Dutch origin